Christoph Halper (born 21 May 1998) is an Austrian professional footballer who plays for SV Lafnitz.

Club career
On 12 August 2020, he signed a two-year contract with SKN St. Pölten.

Halper signed with SV Lafnitz on 28 December 2021.

References

1998 births
Living people
Austrian footballers
Austria under-21 international footballers
Association football midfielders
SV Mattersburg players
SKN St. Pölten players
Austrian Football Bundesliga players
SV Lafnitz players